Brother Bear: An Original Walt Disney Records Soundtrack is the soundtrack to Disney's 2003 animated feature film Brother Bear. It contains the film's music composed by Mark Mancina and Phil Collins, as well as songs written by Collins, and performed by Tina Turner, The Blind Boys of Alabama, Oren Waters, The Bulgarian Women's Choir, and even Collins himself. Much of the soundtrack in the film consists of the songs performed by Collins as a montage, much like what was done with the earlier Disney soundtrack to film Tarzan, but not entirely. The album was released on October 21, 2003 by Walt Disney Records.

Although not released as a single, "On My Way" was featured prominently in commercials for the film. The song is about going off to new places with new friends, and Collins sings it during a montage when Kenai befriends Koda. The number is also sometimes listed as "Send Me on My Way".

Track listing

"Welcome" was also featured as the theme for Walt Disney's Parade of Dreams at Disneyland.

Collins performed "Look Through My Eyes" on the British show Top Of The Pops when it was charted at number 20

Personnel 
Credits (Track 1)
 Phil Collins – vocals, drums, arrangements 
 Jamie Muhoberac – keyboards 
 Carmen Rizzo – programming 
 Dan Chase – programming
 Tim Pierce – guitars 
 Paul Bushnell – bass 
 Rob Cavallo – arrangements
 David Campbell – string arrangements and conductor 

Credits (Tracks 2-13)
 Phil Collins – instruments, vocal arrangements, arrangements (2-9), vocals (3, 4, 6-9), score composing (10-12)
 Mark Mancina – instruments, vocal arrangements, arrangements (2, 5-8), score composing (10-12)
 Jamie Muhoberac – keyboards 
 Tim Heintz – acoustic piano, Hammond B3 organ
 Frank Marocco – accordion
 George Doering – guitars 
 Tim May – guitars 
 Dean Parks – guitars 
 Tim Pierce – guitars 
 Nathan East – bass guitar
 Trey Henry – bass guitar
 Jimmy Johnson – bass guitar
 Kenny Wild – bass guitar
 Luis Conte – percussion 
 Michael Fisher – percussion 
 Louis Mollino III – percussion 
 Tommy Morgan – bass harmonica
 Pedro Eustache – world woodwinds
 Chris Montan – arrangements (4)
 Eddie Jobson – choral arrangements (5)
 Tanja Andreeva – choir coordinator (5)
 Lorena Williams – Inuit translation (5)
 Tina Turner – vocals (2)
 The Bulgarian Women's Choir – choir (5)
 The Blind Boys of Alabama – vocals (7)
 Oren Waters – vocals (7)
 David Metzger – orchestrations, vocal arrangements
 Ralph Morrison – concertmaster 
 Don Harper – orchestra conductor
 Sandy de Crescent – score contractor
 Reggie Wilson – song contractor  
 Carmen Carter – vocal contractor 
 Bobbi Page – vocal contractor
 Booker White – supervising music copyist for Walt Disney Music Library

Production 
Track 1
 Rob Cavallo – producer 
 Cheryl Jenets – production coordinator 
 Allen Sides – recording 
 Chris Lord-Alge – mixing 
 Keith Armstrong – recording assistant 
 Jimmy Hoyson – recording assistant
 John Morrical – recording assistant 
 Tom Sweeney – recording assistant 
 Tal Herzberg – Pro Tools engineer
 Doug McKeon – Pro Tools engineer
 Bernie Grundman – mastering at Bernie Grundman Mastering (Hollywood, California)

Tracks 2-13
 Phil Collins – producer (2-9, 13)
 Mark Mancina – producer (2, 5-8, 10, 11, 12)
 Chris Montan – producer (4)
 Chris Goldsmith – additional vocal production (7)
 Frank Wolf – recording and mixing (songs)
 Steve Kempster – recording and mixing (scores and songs)
 Chris Lord-Alge – mixing (4)
 Jimmy Hoyson, Ivo Keremidchiev, Ron Kurz and Andrew Page – additional engineers
 Kremena Anguelova, Vladislav Boyadjiev, Brian Dixon, Roumen Enchev, Steve Genewick, Mike Glines, Tom Hardisty, Tim Lauber, Evan Lloyd, Jason Locklin, Carsten Schmid, Ed Woolley – assistant engineers
 Johnny Whieldon – score assistant engineer 
 Seth Dockstader, Marc Gebauer, David Marquette, Jay Selvester and Richard Wheeler – scoring crew
 Earl Ghaffari – music editing
 Daniel Gaber – music editing assistant 
 Geoff Callingham, Danny Gillen and Steve Jones – technical crew for Phil Collins 
 Rich Toenes – technical support 
 Chuck Choi – technical consultant 
 Bernie Grundman – mastering (4) at Bernie Grundman Mastering (Hollywood, California)
 Tom MacDougall – music production supervisor 
 Deniece Hall – music production coordinator 
 Andrew Page – music production manager 
 Joel Berke and Jill Iverson – music production assistants

Other Credits
 Chris Montan – executive producer
 Patricia Sullivan Fourstar – album mastering at Bernie Grundman Mastering (Hollywood, California)
 Federico F. Tio – creative director
 John Blas and Arnaldo D'Alfonso – cover art
 Luis M. Fernández – art direction 
 Marcella Wong – design
 Glen Lajeski – creative marketing 
 Lorenzo Aguis – photos of Phil Collins 
 Richard McLaren – photo of Tina Turner 
 Steve Sherman – photo of The Blind Boys of Alabama

Charts
Album

Singles

Reception
AllMusic  [ link]
Common Sense Media  link

References

 https://www.discogs.com/Mark-Mancina-And-Phil-Collins-Brother-Bear-An-Original-Disney-Records-Soundtrack/release/2830268

2003 soundtrack albums
2000s film soundtrack albums
Phil Collins soundtracks
Soundtrack
Disney animation soundtracks
Walt Disney Records soundtracks
Albums produced by Phil Collins
Albums produced by Rob Cavallo
Albums produced by Mark Mancina
Comedy film soundtracks
Drama film soundtracks